The McGowan Creek Formation is a geologic formation in Idaho. It preserves fossils dating back to the Carboniferous period.

See also

 List of fossiliferous stratigraphic units in Idaho
 Paleontology in Idaho

References
 

Carboniferous Idaho
Carboniferous southern paleotropical deposits